This page shows all-time aggregate tables and average attendances for the Scandinavian football tournament Royal League.

All-time table by country

All-time table by club

All-time average attendances by country